Bonham Independent School District is a public school district based in Bonham, Texas, United States.  In addition to Bonham, the district also serves the cities of Bailey and Ravenna.

The district operates one high school, Bonham High School.

Finances
As of the 2010–2011 school year, the appraised valuation of property in the district was $539,384,000. The maintenance tax rate was $0.104 and the bond tax rate was $0.008 per $100 of appraised valuation.

Academic achievement
In 2011, the school district was rated "academically acceptable" by the Texas Education Agency. 49% of districts in Texas in 2011 received the same rating. No state accountability ratings will be given to districts in 2012. A school district in Texas can receive one of four possible rankings from the Texas Education Agency: Exemplary (the highest possible ranking), Recognized, Academically Acceptable, and Academically Unacceptable (the lowest possible ranking).

Historical district TEA accountability ratings
2013: Met Standard
2012: No Rating Given
2011: Academically Acceptable
2010: Recognized
2009: Academically Acceptable
2008: Academically Acceptable
2007: Academically Acceptable
2006: Academically Acceptable
2005: Academically Acceptable
2004: Academically Acceptable

Schools
In the 2011–2012 school year, the district had students in six schools.

Regular instructional
Bonham High School (grades 9-12)
L.H. Rather Junior High School (grades 7-8)
I.W. Evans Intermediate School (grades 4-6)
Finley-Oates Elementary School (grades K-3)
Fannin County Head Start (pre-K)

DAEP instructional
Special Assignment Center (grades 5-12)

See also

List of school districts in Texas
List of high schools in Texas

References

External links
 

School districts in Fannin County, Texas